Hall County is a county in the U.S. state of Nebraska. As of the 2010 United States Census, the population was 58,607, making it Nebraska's fourth-most populous county. Its county seat is Grand Island. The county was formed in 1858; it was named for Augustus Hall, an early judge of this territory.

Hall County is part of the Grand Island, NE Metropolitan Statistical Area.

In the Nebraska license plate system, Hall County is represented by the prefix 8. Hall County had the eighth-largest number of vehicles registered in the county when the license plate system was established in 1922.

Geography
The Platte River flows northeastward across the lower portion of Hall County; the South Loup River flows northeastward across the NW corner of the county; both flowing to their eventual drainage into the Missouri River.

Hall County has the highest density of tornado activity in Nebraska, with 121 tornadoes per , about 4 times the state average.

Major highways

  Interstate 80
  U.S. Route 30
  U.S. Route 34
  U.S. Route 281
  Nebraska Highway 2
  Nebraska Highway 11

Adjacent counties

 Merrick County – northeast
 Hamilton County – east
 Adams County – south
 Kearney County – southwest
 Howard County – north
 Buffalo County – west

Protected areas

 Cheyenne State Recreation Area
 Cornhusker State Wildlife Management Area
 Denman Island State Wildlife Management Area (part)
 Hannon Federal Waterfowl Production Area
 Loch Linda State Wildlife Management Area
 Martins Reach State Wildlife Management Area
 Mormon Island State Recreation Area
 Wood River West State Wildlife Management Area

Demographics

As of the 2000 United States Census, there were 53,534 people, 20,356 households, and 14,086 families in the county. The population density was 98 people per square mile (38/km2). There were 21,574 housing units at an average density of 40 per square mile (15/km2). The racial makeup of the county was 88.67% White, 0.36% Black or African American, 0.31% Native American, 1.09% Asian, 0.14% Pacific Islander, 8.19% from other races, and 1.24% from two or more races. 14.00% of the population were Hispanic or Latino of any race.

There were 20,356 households, out of which 34.80% had children under the age of 18 living with them, 55.90% were married couples living together, 9.70% had a female householder with no husband present, and 30.80% were non-families. 25.50% of all households were made up of individuals, and 10.50% had someone living alone who was 65 years of age or older. The average household size was 2.57 and the average family size was 3.08.

The county population contained 27.20% under the age of 18, 8.90% from 18 to 24, 28.30% from 25 to 44, 21.70% from 45 to 64, and 14.00% who were 65 years of age or older. The median age was 36 years. For every 100 females, there were 98.40 males. For every 100 females age 18 and over, there were 96.20 males.

The median income for a household in the county was $36,972, and the median income for a family was $43,963. Males had a median income of $29,158 versus $20,576 for females. The per capita income for the county was $17,386. 12.00% of the population and 9.20% of families were below the poverty line. Out of the total population, 15.50% of those under the age of 18 and 8.30% of those 65 and older were living below the poverty line.

Communities

Cities 

 Grand Island
 Wood River

Villages 

 Alda
 Cairo
 Doniphan
 Shelton (part)

Unincorporated communities 

 Abbott

 Cameron

 Hansen

Politics
Hall County has been a Republican Party stronghold for most of its history at the presidential level. In only four presidential elections from 1880 to the present has a Democratic Party candidate carried the county, the most recent being Lyndon B. Johnson in 1964.

See also
 National Register of Historic Places listings in Hall County, Nebraska

References

External links
 Hall County official site 
 Nebraska Tornado Density

 
Grand Island micropolitan area
1858 establishments in Nebraska Territory
Populated places established in 1858